The imperial election of 1792 was the final imperial election held to select the emperor of the Holy Roman Empire.  It took place in Frankfurt on July 5.

Background 
Leopold II, Holy Roman Emperor died on March 1, 1792.

French Revolution 

Following the Seven Years' War and its support of the United States in the American Revolutionary War, the French government was deeply in debt.  Its main source of income was a burdensome tax on its peasants which could not be much increased.  As 1789 dawned, after years of bad harvests, it stood at the brink of a financial and social crisis.

In order to resolve the crisis, the king, Louis XVI of France, called the Estates General of 1789 on January 24.  The Estates General quickly became mired in disputes over the representation of the various estates.  On June 17, after months of such disputes, the Third Estate, representing the common people, declared itself the National Assembly.  On June 20, the National Assembly swore not to disperse until they had established a constitution.

The dismissal of the Controller-General of Finances Jacques Necker, seen as sympathetic to the Third Estate, and the gathering of the army outside Paris led to fears that the National Assembly and its supporters among the people were soon to be crushed.  In response, a bourgeois militia, the National Guard, was spontaneously established on July 13.  On July 14, the National Guard stormed the Bastille, a prison and armory, and killed its defenders.  On July 15, the army outside Paris withdrew to its garrisons.  The capital would never return to effective royal control.  During the night of June 20, 1791, the king and his wife, Leopold's sister Marie Antoinette, fled Paris in an attempt to meet counterrevolutionary troops at Montmédy.  They were recognized and arrested on June 21 at Varennes-en-Argonne.

On August 27, Leopold and Frederick William II of Prussia, king of Prussia, issued the Declaration of Pillnitz, calling for the release of Louis and Marie Antoinette and promising that, if his safety was threatened, and with the support of the other monarchs of Europe, they would go to war to restore him.  The National Assembly interpreted the declaration as a declaration of war against the revolutionary government.  On April 20, 1792, it declared war on Leopold's son Francis, his successor as king of Hungary, Croatia, and Bohemia.

Election of 1792 
The prince-electors called to choose Leopold's successor were:

 Friedrich Karl Joseph von Erthal, elector of Mainz
 Clemens Wenceslaus of Saxony, elector of Trier
 Archduke Maximilian Francis of Austria, elector of Cologne
 Francis, king of Bohemia
 Charles Theodore, elector of Bavaria
 Frederick Augustus I, elector of Saxony
 Frederick William II of Prussia, elector of Brandenburg
 George III of the United Kingdom, elector of Brunswick-Lüneburg

Elected 
Francis was elected.  He was crowned as Francis II in Frankfurt on July 14.

Aftermath 
On September 20, a Prussian army advancing on Paris was stopped at the Battle of Valmy, the first significant victory for the French revolutionary government.  On August 23, 1793, that government issued a decree calling for a levée en masse, the conscription of all able-bodied men between eighteen and twenty-five years of age.  The dramatic increase in French manpower and the tactical brilliance of the brigadier general Napoleon, who saw his first major action as an artillery commander in the Siege of Toulon that same year, led to increasing military success.  By the end of 1794, France had conquered the territories of the Holy Roman Empire west of the Rhine.  Prussia recognized these conquests and withdrew from the first coalition against France in the secret Peace of Basel of April 5, 1795.

On February 9, 1801, France and the Holy Roman Empire signed the Treaty of Lunéville, under which the latter recognized French conquests up to the Rhine as well as the independence of a number of French client states.  The Reichsdeputationshauptschluss, passed by the Imperial Diet on March 24, 1803, and ratified by Francis on April 27, reorganized the Empire in recognition of the territorial changes under the treaty.  The electorates of Mainz, Trier and Cologne were abolished.  Karl Theodor Anton Maria von Dalberg, archbishop and prince-elector of Mainz, was created archbishop and prince-elector of Regensburg.  Mainz's territory east of the Rhine was divided among Regensburg, Hesse-Darmstadt, Prussia and the counties of what would become the Duchy of Nassau.  Trier's territory east of the Rhine was also divided among the counties of Nassau.  Cologne's territory east of the Rhine was divided between Hesse-Darmstadt and Arenberg.  Francis's younger brother Ferdinand III, Grand Duke of Tuscany, deprived of Tuscany in the course of the French Revolutionary Wars, was created elector of Salzburg.  The Duchy of Württemberg, the Margraviate of Baden and the Landgraviate of Hesse-Kassel were raised to the electorates of Württemberg, Baden and Hesse, respectively.

Hostilities between France and Francis II broke out again in 1805.  Following Napoleon's historic victory over Russia and the Holy Roman Empire at the Battle of Austerlitz on December 2, the latter was forced to conclude the Peace of Pressburg on December 26.  Under the terms of this treaty, Francis II recognized the royal titles of the kings of Bavaria and Württemberg, and ceded to Napoleon's allies in Bavaria, Württemberg and Baden substantial Austrian territories in Germany.  He also ceded some Austrian land south of the Alps to Italy, a client of Napoleon.

On July 12, 1806, Baden, Bavaria, Berg, Hesse, Regensburg and Württemberg established the Confederation of the Rhine, with Napoleon as its protector.  On August 1, they seceded from the Holy Roman Empire.  On August 6, Francis resigned as emperor and declared the Empire dissolved.

1792
1792 elections
1792 in the Holy Roman Empire
18th-century elections in Europe
Non-partisan elections
Francis II, Holy Roman Emperor